Chandpur Polytechnic Institute or CPI is a government polytechnic institute in Chandpur, Bangladesh. The institute is located at the city area Kachua,  from the Chandpur City.

Course
The "Diploma-in-Engineering" degree is rated higher than the HSC certificate, and both are lesser than a formal Baccalaureate or BSc (Bachelor in Science) degree. They are the entry level diplomas for enrolling into any B.Sc. in engineering degrees.  Students which complete the Diploma-in-Engineering (4 year-long curriculum) courses acquire an educational level equivalent to grade XIV (14th grade); students who complete the HSC level (2 year-long curriculum), acquire an educational level equivalent to grade XII (12th grade).  Most of the diploma-in-engineering curricula were extended from a 3-year study period to a four-year-long study period.  In the "Madrasah Education System", 14th grade is also known as 'Fazil' level.

See also 
 Faridpur Polytechnic Institute
 Dhaka Polytechnic Institute

References
2. Chandpur Polytechnic Institute

Institute Website

External links 
 

Vocational education in Bangladesh
Polytechnic institutes in Bangladesh
Colleges in Chandpur District
Educational institutions established in 2005
2005 establishments in Bangladesh